Yedigaryan is an Armenian surname. Notable people with the surname include:

Artak Yedigaryan (born 1990), Armenian footballer
Artur Yedigaryan (born 1987), Armenian footballer

Armenian-language surnames